Khaset (Mountain bull, also Chasuu) was one of 42 nomes (administrative division) in ancient Egypt.

Geography
Khaset was one of the 20 nomes in Lower Egypt and had district number 6.

The area of the district is not readable, usually the nomes were about 30-40 km (18-24 miles) in length and their area depending on the depth of the Nile valley and the beginning of the desert. The area was calculated in cha-ta (1 cha-ta equals roughly 2.75 hectare / 2.4 acres) and the distance was calculated in iteru (1 iteru equals roughly 10.5 km / 6.2 miles) in length. 

The Niwt (main city) was Khasu/Xois (part of modern Sakha) and among other cities were Per-Wadjet/Buto (modern Tell el-Farain). Per-Wadjet was sometimes also part of the Sap-Meh nome.

History
Every nome was ruled by a nomarch (provincial governor) who answered directly to the pharaoh.

Every niwt had a Het net (temple) dedicated to the chief deity and a Heqa het (nomarch's residence).

The district's main deities were Wadjet and Ra. Other major deities in the area included Isis and Osiris.
Today the area is part of the Gharbia Governorate.

References

 Helck, Wolfgang ; Westendorf, Wolfhart: Lexikon der Ägyptologie. Wiesbaden: Harrassowitz 1977.

External links

 About the nomes of Egypt
 Detailed map of the nomes
 Hieroglyphs of the nomes

Nomes of ancient Egypt